Franz Rudolf Bornewasser (born 12 March 1866 in Radevormwald; died 20 December 1951 in Trier) was a Roman Catholic Bishop of Trier, in Germany, during the Nazi era.

In 1941, the Bishop of Münster, Clemens August von Galen, publicly denounced the Nazi “euthanasia” program in a sermon, and telegrammed his text to Hitler. Franz Bornewasser also sent protests to Hitler, though not in public.

Documents prepared by the American OSS, and used in evidence at the Nuremberg Trials, record that the Nazis were cautious with regard to the murder of church leaders, and conscious of not wanting to create martyrs. Nevertheless, Catholic leaders frequently faced violence or the threat of violence, particularly at the hands of the SA, the SS or Hitler Youth. A number of cases were cited by the OSS, including two attacks against Bishop Bornewasser of Trier.

See also

Nazi persecution of the Catholic Church
Catholic resistance to Nazism

References

1866 births
1951 deaths
Roman Catholic bishops of Trier
20th-century German Roman Catholic bishops
People from Oberbergischer Kreis
Roman Catholics in the German Resistance
20th-century German Roman Catholic priests